This is a partial list of dams in France.

Mainland
Alrance Dam
Lac d'Apremont
Bassin de Lampy
Bassin de Saint-Ferréol
Bissorte Dam
Lac de la Cavayère
Lac de Chambon
Lac de Coiselet
Donzère-Mondragon Dam
Eguzon Dam
Étang de Soulcem
Génissiat Dam
Glanum Dam
Grand'Maison Dam
La Jourdanie Dam
Lac de Vouglans
Malpasset Dam
Marèges Dam
Lac de Moron
Pinet Dam
Le Pouget Dam
Le Truel Dam
Roselend Dam
Étang de Saint-Quentin
Lac de Serre-Ponçon
Sivens Dam
Tignes Dam
Lac de Vassivière
Lac de Vouglans
Lac du Verney

French Guiana
 Petit-Saut Dam

French Polynesia
Faatautia (Hita'a) Dam
Tahinu Dam
Tevaiohiro Dam
Titaaviri Dam
Vaihiria Dam
Vaite Dam
Vainavenave Dam
Vaitapaa Dam
Vaituoru Dam

New Caledonia
Néaoua Dam
Tu Dam
Yaté Dam

References
http://www.industrie.gouv.fr/energie/hydro/caracalph.htm  — French government's list of dams in France

France
Dams and reservoirs